Adkalgud  is a village in the southern state of Karnataka, India. It is located in the Devadurga taluk of Paschim CHAMPARAN.

See also 
 Raichur
 Districts of Karnataka

References

External links 
 http://Raichur.nic.in/

Villages in Raichur district